The Bristolian began as a newspaper in 1827 under the control of the radical journalist James Acland. Undercutting the advertising rates of existing weekly papers, conducting a lively letter column and breaking the law by publishing at one and a half pence without paying the newspaper stamp tax, Acland’s publication was a muck-raking popular radical paper for the working classes. The paper concentrated on exposing the abuses both of the unreformed Corporation which ran Bristol and of the Courts, and was spiced up with demands for an overhaul of the national political system.

Acland was imprisoned in 1829 but not before he had fanned the flames of popular revolt. In 1830 he stood, unsuccessfully, for Parliament. The following year, the city exploded with the 1831 Bristol riots in which the wealthy elite attacked by Acland in his newspaper were physically affronted with the discontent it had seeded.

The original title was resurrected in 2001 as a new monthly publication offering "independent news from Bristol that the other papers won’t touch”. It was distributed for free in the bars and pubs of Bristol and circulation peaked at 10,000 copies a week. Ian Bone wrote much of the paper, assisted by local journalist Roy Norris and by his long-term partner Jane Nicholl. The success of The Bristolian led to the Bristolian Party, which stood in the 2003 Bristol City Council elections in an attempt to mobilise discontent with Bristol City Council's policies. On 1 May 2003, 2,560 people voted for the Bristolian Party, which gained an 8% share of the vote in the 12 wards they contested.

In 2005 The Bristolian, under editor Ian Bone, was runner-up for the Paul Foot Award for investigative journalism, though it ceased publication not long after.

The title was revived again in 2013 under an anonymous collective, "The Committee for Public Safety", in response to the direct election of the Mayor of Bristol and perceived diminishing accountability of the city's local government.

References 

1827 establishments in England
Newspapers published in Bristol
Publications established in 1827
Publications established in 2001
Newspapers established in 2013